The Pistoia Brazilian war cemetery is a former Second World War cemetery located in Pistoia, Toscana, Italy. The cemetery site honors Brazilian soldiers who died in Italy, the remains of the soldiers were moved to the Brazilian Monument and Tomb of the Unknown Soldier of World War II in 1960.

History
In 1944 Brazil participated in the Second World War with 25,000 soldiers of the Brazilian Expeditionary Force against the Axis in the Serchio Valley, in Versilia and in Garfagnana, on the Appennini.

In their final advance, the Brazilians reached Turin and on 2 May they joined up with French troops at the border in Susa.

The Pistoia Brazilian war cemetery contains the remains of 463 Brazilian soldiers, most of whom lost their lives in the Spring offensive in Italy (Fornovo) in 1945. Until 1960 the soldiers remained buried in the cemetery near Pistoia.

In 1960, the cemetery was closed and their remains were officially interred in Brazil, with other Brazilian second world war soldiers, at the new National Monument to the Dead of World War II (Monumento Nacional aos Mortos da Segunda Guerra Mundial). It is located on Guanabara Bay in Flamengo Park, in the Flamengo district of Rio de Janeiro.

Brazilian Monument and Tomb of the Unknown Soldier of World War II
After the remains were transferred, the body of a soldier was found remaining in the cemetery. The Brazilian Government chose to leave and honor it there, in a new votive Tomb of the Unknown Soldier.

In 1967 the cemetery reopened with the inauguration of a Modernist votive Brazilian Monument and Tomb of the Unknown Soldier of World War II. The monument's serene site plan: with stone terraces, the votive "Tomb of the Unknown Soldier" memorial, and a sculptural open pavilion; were designed by Brazilian modernist architect Olavo Redig de Campos (1906–1984), a contemporary of Oscar Niemeyer.

The Monument has been visited by two Presidents of Brazil.

See also

 Brazil in World War II
 Brazilian Expeditionary Force
 National Monument to the Dead of World War II – Rio de Janeiro.
 World War II memorials in Italy

References

Bibliography 
 Walter Bellisi, Arrivano i nostri : il Brasile nella seconda guerra mondiale, la presa di Monte Castello e la battaglia di Montese, Formigine (MO) : Golinelli, 1995
 Fabio Gualandi, Monumenti dedicati al soldato brasiliano pela Forca Expedicionaria Brasileira (F.E.B.) na campanha da Italia, Vergato, Tip. Ferri, 2005

Brazil in World War II
Pistoia
World War II memorials in Italy
World War II cemeteries in Italy
World War II cemeteries
Modernist architecture in Italy
Vargas Era